The 2016 OFC Nations Cup Final was a football match that took place on 11 June 2016 at the Sir John Guise Stadium, Port Moresby. It was the final match of the 2016 OFC Nations Cup, the 10th edition of the OFC Nations Cup, a competition for national teams in Oceania.

It was contested between New Zealand and hosts Papua New Guinea. It was New Zealand's 5th final, previously having won three of them as well as a fourth title in the round robin system used in the 2008 edition. It was Papua New Guinea's first appearance in a final of the competition. In the group stage, New Zealand topped Group B without dropping a point while Papua New Guinea won Group A on goal difference with two draws and a win. In the semi-finals New Zealand beat New Caledonia 1–0 and Papua New Guinea beat Solomon Islands 2–1.

Neither team managed to score in 90 minutes so the game went to extra time. The 30 minutes of extra time produced no goals, so the game went to penalties. Papua New Guinea's Koriak Upaiga was first to miss in the shootout. After three penalties each, the score was 3–2 to New Zealand. The next penalty for both teams was missed with Jeremy Brockie for New Zealand and Raymond Gunemba for Papua New Guinea both missing their spot kicks. This left Marco Rojas with the opportunity to seal the game for New Zealand. He did so and in doing so qualified his nation for the 2017 FIFA Confederations Cup. The 2016 final was the first OFC Nations Cup final to be decided on penalties.

Background
New Zealand were playing in their 5th OFC Nations Cup final, having won in 1973, 1998 and 2002 and having lost in 2000. They had also won the competition in 2008 when the winner was decided in a round-robin system. Papua New Guinea were featuring in their first OFC Nations Cup final. In their three previous OFC Nations Cup participations before 2016, they didn't get out of the group stage.

The two nations had met in official FIFA matches four times before the 2016 OFC Nations Cup Final. The first two matches were in 1997 as part of the second round of  Oceanian 1988 FIFA World Cup qualification. The first game was in Port Moresby, Papua New Guinea and Papua New Guinea won 1–0 with Francis Niakuam scoring the winning goal. In the return match held in Auckland, New Zealand, New Zealand won 7–0. New Zealand ended up topping the qualification group and progressing to the final stage while Papua New Guinea finished bottom of the group. The third match between the two nations was in the 2002 OFC Nations Cup and New Zealand won 9–1. The fourth and most recent game between New Zealand and Papua New Guinea before the 2016 OFC Nations Cup final, was in Group B of the 2012 OFC Nations Cup. New Zealand won 2–1 and that meant they led the head-to-head record between themselves and Papua New Guinea 3–1 before the 2016 OFC Nations Cup Final.

Route to the final

Match

Details

References

Final
OFC Nations Cup Finals
2018 FIFA World Cup qualification (OFC)
New Zealand national football team matches
Papua New Guinea national football team matches
2015–16 in New Zealand association football
OFC Nations Cup Final 2016
June 2016 sports events in Oceania